Allelujah is a 2022 British drama film directed by Richard Eyre and written by Heidi Thomas. It is based on Alan Bennett's play of the same name. The film stars Jennifer Saunders, Bally Gill, Russell Tovey, David Bradley, Derek Jacobi, and Judi Dench.

Allelujah had its world premiere at the 2022 Toronto International Film Festival on 11 September 2022, and was released in the United Kingdom on 17 March 2023, by Warner Bros. Pictures.

Plot 
The threatened closure of a geriatric ward in a small Yorkshire hospital stirs an uprising from the local community, who invite a news crew to film preparations for a concert in honour of the hospital’s most distinguished nurse.

Cast 
 Jennifer Saunders as Sister Gilpin
 Judi Dench as Mary Moss
 Russell Tovey as Colin Colman
 David Bradley as Joe Colman
 Derek Jacobi as Ambrose
 Bally Gill as Dr. Valentine
 Gerard Horan as Mr. Earnshaw
 Jessica Baglow as Dr. Jess
 Eileen Davies as Molly

Production 
In October 2021, it was announced that Judi Dench, Derek Jacobi, Jennifer Saunders, Bally Gill, Russell Tovey, and David Bradley had joined the cast of the film, and principal photography began later that month.

Release 
Allelujah had its world premiere at the 2022 Toronto International Film Festival.  The film is set to be distributed by Pathé in France and Switzerland and in the United Kingdom through Warner Bros. Pictures.

References

External links 
 

2022 films
2022 drama films
BBC Film films
British drama films
British films based on plays
Films directed by Richard Eyre
Films scored by George Fenton
2020s British films
Pathé films
Warner Bros. films